Konadegawa Dam is a rockfill dam located in Toyama prefecture in Japan. The dam is used for flood control and water supply. The catchment area of the dam is 31.8 km2. The dam impounds about 70  ha of land when full and can store 6600 thousand cubic meters of water. The construction of the dam was started on 1969 and completed in 1978.

References

Dams in Toyama Prefecture
1978 establishments in Japan